Neomy Storch (born 1954) is an Australian linguist. She is currently an Associate Professor of applied linguistics at the University of Melbourne, Australia. Her research focuses on second language acquisition with a special focus on second language writing. She is noted for her work on second language acquisition, collaborative writing, and academic writing.

Career 
Storch obtained her Bachelor of Economics degree at the Monash University in 1976. In 1995 she obtained her Master of Arts degree and in 2001 a PhD at the University of Melbourne.

Since 2010, she has been a member of the editorial board of the Journal of Second Language Writing.

Publications
Storch's work has been published in the Journal of Second Language Writing, Language Learning, TESOL Quarterly, Language Teaching Research, Language Testing, System and Studies in Second Language Acquisition.

In 2013 her first book, entitled Collaborative Writing in L2 Classrooms on collaborative writing was published by Multilingual Matters.

Awards 
2004-2006: Discovery Projects (The role of feedback in second language learning processes) awarded by the Australian Research Council
2007: Dyason Fellowship awarded by the University of Melbourne

Personal life
Dr Storch is married and has two adult sons, all of whom she thanked in the acknowledgement section of her PhD thesis.

Bibliography

Books
Teaching Writing for Academic Purposes to Multilingual Students. (2017)

Articles
"Patterns of interaction in ESL pair work." (2002)
"Collaborative writing: Product, process, and students’ reflections." (2005)
"Is there a role for the use of the L1 in an L2 setting?" (2003)
"How collaborative is pair work? ESL tertiary students composing in pairs." (2001)
"Pair versus individual writing: Effects on fluency, complexity and accuracy." (2009)

References

External links 
 

1950 births
Living people
Applied linguists
Second language writing
Linguists from Australia
Women linguists